The skyline operator is the subject of an optimization problem, used in a query to filter results from a database to keep only those objects that are not worse than any other.

This operator is an extension to SQL proposed by Börzsönyi et al.  A classic example of application of the skyline operator involves selecting a hotel for a holiday. The user wants the hotel to be both cheap and close to the beach. However, hotels that are close to the beach may also be expensive. In this case, the skyline operator would only present those hotels that are not worse than any other hotel in both price and distance to the beach.

Proposed syntax 

To give an example in SQL: Börzsönyi et al. proposed the following syntax for the skyline operator:

SELECT ... FROM ... WHERE ...
GROUP BY ... HAVING ...
SKYLINE OF [DISTINCT] d1 [MIN | MAX | DIFF],
                 ..., dm [MIN | MAX | DIFF]
ORDER BY ...
where d1, ... dm denote the dimensions of the skyline and MIN, MAX and DIFF specify whether the value in that dimension should be minimised, maximised or simply be different.

Implementation 
The skyline operator can be implemented directly in SQL using current SQL constructs, but this has been shown to be very slow. Other algorithms have been proposed that make use of divide and conquer, indices, MapReduce and general-purpose computing on graphics cards. Skyline queries on data streams (i.e. continuous skyline queries) have been studied in the context of parallel query processing on multicores, owing to their wide diffusion in real-time decision making problems and data streaming analytics.

See also 
Pareto efficiency
Multi-objective optimization
Convex hull
Nearest neighbor search
Selection algorithm

References

Data management
Query languages
Relational database management systems
SQL